Mohammad Saleh Esfahani was a Persian calligrapher in the Safavid era. He was the son and student of Aboutorab Esfahani. He was a follower of Mir Emad's style. Many of the inscriptions on the historical buildings in Isfahan like the inscription on the iwan of Chehel Sotoun palace are his works. He died on 3 April 1714.

References 

Iranian calligraphers
1600s births
1714 deaths
17th-century calligraphers of Safavid Iran
18th-century calligraphers of Safavid Iran